Marlborough Mall is a shopping mall located in Calgary, Alberta, Canada. Opened in November 1971, the mall has expanded several times and today includes approximately 100 stores and services, and encompasses over 584,000 square feet. The mall also featured a Safeway until the 1990s, when the store moved to its own location west of 36th Street.

The current anchor store is Wal-Mart, as Sears closed its doors in March 2017.

Location
The mall is located in the northeast quadrant of the city, in the community of Marlborough next to the Marlborough C-Train Station. It is located at the corner of Memorial Drive and 36th Street.

Physically it shares the same block as the Applewood Village condominiums. The south and west ends of the mall are bound by 4-lane divided roads. The mall itself is located in a residential zone on the edges of the Franklin commercial area and is nearly surrounded by other commercial ventures.  To the west lies a commercial park with a car dealership and several mini-malls and standalone retailers.  One block to the northwest lies Pacific Place (formerly Franklin Mall) and directly west is a strip mall called Northgate.  The larger, 2 level Sunridge Mall as well as a Real Canadian Superstore outlet is one C-Train stop to the north, about 2000 metres away, itself in a very large commercial setting with several blocks of stores concentrated together.

History
The mall was a joint development of Great West International Equities Ltd and Kowall Holdings Ltd, both Calgary firms. The original anchor tenants were Woolco and Canada Safeway. Construction began in 1971. A formal ground-turning event took place on June 19 of that year, with representatives of six community associations taking part. The mall was built quickly and Woolco had a grand opening event on November 24, 1971.

Marlborough Town Square expansion
Renovations in 1976 later expanded the mall northward and added Simpsons-Sears as an additional anchor tenant at the north end of the mall in the spring of 1977. The mall was rebranded as "Marlborough Town Square" and expanded from 30+ to over 100 retail tenants, including the 127,000 square foot Sears store and a 5-storey office tower to house professional services such as doctors, dentists and lawyers. The mall expanded from 25 to 60 acres with an additional 300,000 square feet of retail and office space, with parking for 3,500 vehicles.

A three-screen motion picture cinema was also included in the renovation. The facility cost $500,000 and was Calgary's second tri-plex. The three theatres were run by Canadian Theatres and could seat 760 viewers. The construction of the theatre was part of a boom in movie theatre construction in Calgary which saw a 64 percent rise in the number of screens in early 1977, from 28 to 46, part of an overall trend to smaller theatres intended to provide flexibility for movie-goers. Siting the theatre inside the mall also permitted ticket-buyers to line up indoors, a novelty for Calgary film-goers at the time and a bonus given Calgary's sometimes intemperate weather.

21st Century renovations
In 2005 the mall underwent a total interior renovation that saw the addition of new tile, additional skylights, and a new mall corridor to access an expansion of Wal-Mart that allowed the addition of several small retailers and the Simpsons-Sears Renamed to Sears. Construction of a modest,  expansion began in the summer of 2010 and involved the addition of a loading dock and space for three new retailers; construction was completed in December 2010. The parking lot has also been reduced from its 3,500+ vehicle capacity by the addition of stand-alone restaurant and fast-food retail spaces on the west side lot between 2014 and 2016.

Tenants
On the day Marlborough Mall opened, four Woolco locations opened across Canada, bringing the total to 47. The Marlborough Woolco had a Red Grille restaurant and automotive centre.

A western Canadian toy chain known as Tops'n Toys had a store in the mall until the early 1990s, when US retailers like Wal-Mart and Toys R Us began competing in the Canadian market. "These US giants bought their toys in volume directly from the manufacturers, and regularly sold certain toys at below cost to attract customers to the stores."

Community
The expansion and rebranding of the mall in 1976 as Marlborough Town Square served as an opportunity for increased community engagement. A full-time promotional staff was hired to co-ordinate community use of the mall, which had grown to over 2,000 feet in length and the inclusion of seven promotional areas, including a performance stage with botanical backdrop in a landscaped outdoor plaza and open-air theatre.

In the past, Marlborough Mall has been an integral part of northeast Calgary's community life. Marlborough Town Square plans to put a greater emphasis on community participation, not only in the north-east, but city-wide.

--The Calgary Albertan, October 13, 1976 

The mall has served as a focal point for social events, hosting a small carnival midway in the west parking lot every summer in the 1970s and 1980s. The Ringling Bros. and Barnum & Bailey Circus has also operated from the west parking lot in the past. Other community activities have included geology displays by the University of Calgary, and booths to promote adult education.

The mall served as an impetus to have 36th Street upgraded, as a petition of businessmen cited the "unsafe" road as a reason residents weren't able to shop there. The road was widened in the mid-1970s and in the mid-1980s the public light rail transit system tracks were laid down the middle.

Layout
The original mall in 1971 comprised 256,000 square feet, fully enclosed and air-conditioned. On expansion in 1976 the mall gained a split level, with the northern portion of the mall slightly higher than the southern. A standard 13-unit food court was located where the split occurred, with both an upper and lower deck for seating. A five-story "professional building" was also added and today houses medical offices including dental, general practice, and sports medicine.

Anchors
Walmart 
MaKami College , formerly Sears and Kal Tire.

References

External links
Marlborough Mall

Shopping malls in Calgary
Shopping malls established in 1972